Nazrul Islam (12 August 1949 – 7 January 2023) was an Indian politician from the state of Assam. He was a member of the Assam Legislative Assembly from Indian National Congress. He was also minister in Tarun Gogoi Government of Assam since 7 June 2002 to 20 May 2016. He had been elected five straight times from the Laharighat constituency since 1996 to 2021.

Islam died on 7 January 2023, at the age of 73.

References 

1949 births
2023 deaths
People from Morigaon district
Indian National Congress politicians
State cabinet ministers of Assam
Assam MLAs 1996–2001
Assam MLAs 2001–2006
Assam MLAs 2006–2011
Assam MLAs 2011–2016
Assam MLAs 2016–2021
Indian National Congress politicians from Assam